Liz Holzman (February 9, 1953 – August 11, 2014) was an American film producer and director. She has won the Emmy Award three times, once for her work on the Warner Bros. animated television show Pinky and the Brain and twice for Animaniacs. Holzman also received an Emmy nomination as a writer for Animaniacs and an Annie Award nomination for her direction of Animaniacs. Among her other production credits are the animated series Baby Blues and The Zeta Project.

Education
Holzman studied at Mills College and at the California Institute of the Arts, where she earned her MFA in film graphics. Formerly Holzman was the Animation Department Chair at the Art Institute of Portland.

Painting
As a painter, Holzman has been represented in several gallery showings, specifically her landscape paintings. A tribute to her can be found in the popular online game World of Warcraft, in the Cathedral Square (coordinates 57,55).

Death
She died on August 11, 2014, from cancer.

References

External links

1953 births
2014 deaths
American film directors
American film producers
California Institute of the Arts alumni
Emmy Award winners
Mills College alumni